Tour of Kuban was a cycling race held in Russia in 2009 and 2015, the latter being held as part of the 2015 UCI Europe Tour. Both editions were won by Russia's Dmitry Samokhvalov.

Winners

References

Cycle races in Russia
2009 establishments in Russia
Recurring sporting events established in 2009
2015 disestablishments in Russia
Recurring sporting events disestablished in 2015
UCI Europe Tour races